Salum Kanoni (born 30 November 1988) is a Tanzanian football defender who plays for Mtibwa Sugar.

References

1988 births
Living people
Tanzanian footballers
Tanzania international footballers
Simba S.C. players
Kagera Sugar F.C. players
Mwadui United F.C. players
Mtibwa Sugar F.C. players
Association football defenders
Tanzanian Premier League players